Jakobski Dol Castle is a 17th-century castle located in the settlement of Spodnji Jakobski Dol, part of the municipality of Pesnica in northeastern Slovenia.

History

Sources mention a precursor of the present castle on the same site in the 15th and 16th centuries. The current structure was built in 1678 by the wife of Graz lawyer, provincial secretary and official dr. Gottfried von Beckham-Widmannstetter. After his death, the manor was inherited by his son, who died in battle soon after. The estate was then held by the Beckh family until 1768, when it was bought first by Kajetan Langenmanntel and then in 1779 by Count Kajetan Auersperg. Five years later in 1784 it was purchased by Franz von Weisseneg, then by Anna the noble Edersheim, and in 1810 by Voss Ignatius, who in 1819 sold it to his son Jacob, who held it until 1850 when it was bought by the baron Dr. Joseph van Erasmus Dur. He owned it until his death in 1880, and subsequently inherited by his son Henry and kept it until 1892, when he bought the family Dolajš, which after a few decades ago the family sold the Van Durr, which lost it with the agrarian reforms when the castle was nationalized.

Castles in Styria (Slovenia)